Petit Manan National Wildlife Refuge is a National Wildlife Refuge in the state of Maine.  It is one of the five refuges that together make up the Maine Coastal Islands National Wildlife Refuge, along with Cross Island, Franklin Island, Seal Island, and Pond Island.

Geography
It is part of the town of Steuben.

The refuge has four mainland divisions. The  Petit Manan Point Division. The Gouldsboro Bay Division protects . The  Sawyer's Marsh Division. The  Corea Heath Division.

Petit Manan NWR includes  acres on 41 islands, stretching the entire coastline of Maine.

References
Maine Coastal Islands National Wildlife Refuge

National Wildlife Refuges in Maine
Protected areas of Hancock County, Maine
Protected areas of Washington County, Maine
Steuben, Maine